Ștei is a town in Bihor County, 
Crișana, Romania. Between 1958 and 1996, it was named Dr. Petru Groza, after the Romanian socialist leader who died in 1958.

The town is located in the southeastern part of the county, and lies on the banks of the river Crișul Negru.

History

The town was founded in 1952, near a village of the same name, as an industrial centre for the grinding of uranium mined at the nearby Băița mine, serving the intensive mining development set as an imperative by the Romanian Communist regime as part of a Soviet-Romanian joint venture during the Soviet occupation of Romania.

Romulus Vereș, the notorious Romanian serial killer, was institutionalised in the Ștei psychiatric facility in 1976, and died there in 1993.

Population
According to the last census from 2011 there were 6,144  people living within the city. 

Of this population, 96.6% are ethnic Romanians, while 2.88% are ethnic Hungarians and 0.5% others.

Natives
 Irina Bara, tennis player (born 1995)
 Camelia Adina Hora, singer (born 1986)

References

Populated places established in 1952
Populated places in Bihor County
Localities in Crișana
Towns in Romania
Monotowns in Romania
1952 establishments in Romania